Ramilya Iskander (born 24 June 1977) is a Russian actress and former model who has acted mainly in theatre and television series. Since 2003, she has been a member of the regular cast of the Russian Academic Youth Theatre (RAMT) in Moscow.

Biography
Iskander was born in 1977 in the village of Kunashak, near the city of Chelyabinsk. She is an ethnic Tatar. Her father is an engineer and her mother a teacher. Iskander was part of her school choir, where she was a solo singer. At the instance of her father, she studied economics at university for some time, but secretly applied for courses at the Chelyabinsk State Institute of Culture to study acting.

Iskander graduated in 1999 and began her acting career at the Chelyabinsk Youth Theatre. In 2002, Iskander moved to Moscow, where he initially starred in the Stanislavski and Nemirovich-Danchenko Theatre. The following year, she moved to the Russian Academic Youth Theatre, known as RAMT. She has been awarded the Moscow City Theater Prize 2013 and the Golden Lyre 2010, among others. In addition to her theatrical work, Iskander has acted in television series and commercials, as well as a voice actress in animations and dubbing of foreign language films. Her most significant film role to date is the female lead in the film Tsar (Царь, 2009) directed by Pavel Lungin, in which she starred Maria Temryukovna, the wife of Tsar Ivan the Terrible.

Iskander gave birth to her first son in August 2013.

References

External links 
 

1977 births
Living people
People from Kunashaksky District
Russian film actresses
Russian stage actresses
Russian television actresses
20th-century Russian actresses
21st-century Russian actresses
Tatar people of Russia